Michael J. Steffen is a United States Navy rear admiral and naval aviator who serves as the commander of Navy Reserve Forces Command since July 11, 2022. He most recently served as the 92nd Commandant of Naval District Washington and deputy commander of the Joint Force Headquarters National Capital Region from June 22, 2021 to June 10, 2022.

Before that, he served as deputy commander of the United States Second Fleet, with tours as commander of Naval Air Station Joint Reserve Base Fort Worth from August 2015 to April 2017 and commander of the inactive Helicopter Anti-Submarine Squadron Light 60 (HSL-60) "Jaguars" (now HSM-60). A native of Bedford, Virginia, Steffen graduated from Virginia Tech in 1992. He received an M.S. degree in global business leadership from the University of San Diego.

In March 2022, he was nominated for promotion to rear admiral.

References

Living people
Date of birth missing (living people)
Year of birth missing (living people)
People from Bedford, Virginia
Military personnel from Virginia
Virginia Tech alumni
University of San Diego alumni
Recipients of the Legion of Merit
United States Naval Aviators
United States Navy admirals